Rakshasudu is a 1986 Telugu-language action crime film produced by K. S. Rama Rao under the Creative Commercials banner and directed by A. Kodandarami Reddy. It stars Chiranjeevi, Radha, Suhasini  while Rajendra Prasad, Sumalatha in special appearances and music composed by Maestro Ilaiyaraaja. The film is based on Yandamuri Veerendranath's novel of the same name. The film is the debut of K. Naga Babu in the film industry.

Plot
The film opens with a widowed woman giving birth to a baby boy. The landlord does not approve of this and has the baby disposed of. A drunkard finds the baby and keeps him for a couple of years until he sells the boy to a labor camp, in exchange for money. 20 years later, that boy, Purusha (Chiranjeevi), and his friend Simham (Nagendra Babu) escape from the labor camp to see Purusha's mother (Annapurna). However, when Purusha goes to the landlord's house, the landlord says that Purusha's mother left a long time ago and for Purusha to get the details, the landlord must be bribed with Rs. 10,000. Purusha and Simham sneak into somebody's house and steal the necessary Rs. 10,000. At the moment, they are caught by J. Krishna Murthy alias JK (Rao Gopal Rao). He tells them that it is alright for them to take the money for their use. By the time Purusha and Simham get to the landlord, the landlord sold the information of Purusha's mother to JK for Rs. 50,000. Purusha, angered, goes to JK for an explanation. JK wants to use Purusha to stop his rival, who sells drugs. Pursha reluctantly refuses at first, but is later convinced. While Purusha, Simham, and Inspector Vijay (Rajendra Prasad) fight some bad guys, Purusha gets injured and jumps into a river. He is saved by a school teacher named Sumathi (Suhasini), who is an orphan. Sumathi also happens to be Vijay's sister. Purusha comes up with a plan to raid important documents to imprison Shailaja's (Radha) father, who is JK's rival, but in the process, Vijay is killed. How Purusha gets his revenge and meets his mother forms the rest of the story.

Cast

 Chiranjeevi as Purusha / Rakshasudu
 Radha as Shailaja / Shailu
 Suhasini as Sumathi
 Tiger Prabhakar as Vankachakra Ram Murthy / VR
 Rao Gopal Rao as J. Krishna Murthy / JK 
 Nagendra Babu as Simham
 Rajendra Prasad as Inspector Vijay
 Allu Ramalingaiah as Narasimham
 Annapurna as Rakshasudu's mother 
 Sumalatha as Vani 
 Samyuktha as JK's daughter
 Jayamala as Tarakeswari
 M. V. S. Haranatha Rao as Narakasurudu
 Narra Venkateswara Rao as Chief Commander 
 P. J. Sarma as SP Bhujanga Rao
 Vankayala Satyanarayana as Sumathi's father 
 Bhimeswara Rao as Principal
 Vasudeva Rao as Rajan
 Jagga Rao
 Master Suresh

Soundtrack

The music was composed by Ilaiyaraaja. All the songs were chartbusters. Music released on Echo Audio Company. The following is the track listing.

Reception
This is the 3rd movie made by K. S. Rama Rao in the Chiranjeevi-Yandamuri Veerendranath-Ilaiyaraaja-A. Kodandarami Reddy combination under Creative Commercials after Abhilasha and Challenge. It was also dubbed into Tamil as Raatshashan and did well in Tamil Nadu as well. The Telugu version did well in reruns too.

References

External links
 

1986 films
Films directed by A. Kodandarami Reddy
1980s Telugu-language films
Films scored by Ilaiyaraaja
Films based on novels by Yandamuri Veerendranath
Indian action films
Films based on Indian novels
1986 action films